Mandy is a 2018 action horror film directed by Panos Cosmatos, produced by Elijah Wood and co-written by Cosmatos and Aaron Stewart-Ahn based on a story Cosmatos conceived. A co-production of the United States and Belgium, the film stars Nicolas Cage, Andrea Riseborough, Linus Roache, Ned Dennehy, Olwen Fouéré, Richard Brake, and Bill Duke.

It premiered at the 2018 Sundance Film Festival on January 19, and was theatrically released on September 14, 2018 by RLJE Films.

Mandy was praised for its style and originality, Cage's performance, Cosmatos' direction, and the action sequences. It is one of the last films scored by Icelandic composer Jóhann Jóhannsson, who died in February 2018. The film is dedicated to him.

Plot
In 1983, near the Shadow Mountains, recovering alcoholic Red Miller lives a solitary life with his girlfriend, artist and author Mandy Bloom. He works as a logger, while she has a day job as a gas station cashier. In their cabin by a lake, Mandy creates elaborate fantasy art, which Red admires greatly.

On her way to work one day, Mandy walks past a van carrying the Children of the New Dawn, a religious cult led by Jeremiah Sand. Sand is struck by Mandy's beauty and orders one of his disciples, Brother Swan, to kidnap Mandy with the help of the Black Skulls, a cannibalistic, demonic biker gang who regularly use a highly potent form of LSD.

That night, Swan drives out to the lake and summons the Black Skulls by blowing a mystical ocarina known as the Horn of Abraxas. After Swan offers them a low-ranking member of the cult as a sacrifice, they break into the couple's home and subdue Mandy and Red. Afterwards, cultists Mother Marlene and Sister Lucy drug Mandy before presenting her to Sand. Sand, a failed musician, attempts to seduce Mandy with his psychedelic folk music, telling her that God had told him to take anything he wanted, but she instead laughs at Sand, infuriating him. In retaliation, he stabs Red, who is bound and gagged with barbed wire, before burning Mandy alive. After Sand and his followers leave, Red frees himself, mourns over Mandy's ashes, goes back inside, and falls asleep. After waking up from a nightmare, he consumes a bottle of vodka, tends to his wounds, and shrieks in agony, grief, and rage.

The next morning, Red fetches his crossbow from his friend Caruthers, who also provides him with freshly crafted bolts and information on the Black Skulls. Caruthers explains that the Black Skulls were former drug couriers who became sadomasochists after they consumed a bad batch of LSD. Before Red leaves, Caruthers warns him that his odds of survival are poor, but Red strives to hunt down the bikers after forging a battle axe. He shoots one with his crossbow and runs him down, but crashes his car and is captured in the process. At their hideout, Red breaks free from his restraints and kills the rest of the bikers. As he investigates their hideout, he consumes some of their drugs, causing him to instantly and severely hallucinate.

Seeking out a radio tower he envisioned earlier, Red encounters The Chemist, a mysterious drug manufacturer, who tells him where to find the Children of the New Dawn. At their makeshift wooden church in a quarry, Red kills Brothers Swan, Hanker, and Klopek, but spares the life of Sister Lucy. In the tunnels beneath the church, Red finds Mother Marlene and decapitates her. He then confronts Sand, taunting him by throwing Marlene's severed head at him before crushing his skull. He sets Sand's body and the church on fire before driving away. As Red drives, he starts envisioning Mandy in the passenger seat of his car, while the landscape behind him now appears fantastical and otherworldly.

Cast

Production
On June 7, 2017, Nicolas Cage was announced as the star of the film. Production used the Arri Alexa camera, coupled with the Panavision anamorphic format, to achieve the film's old-school atmosphere.

Legion M, an entertainment studio that allows fans to invest in and be part of the creation of films, was a production partner for Mandy and hosted a panel discussion featuring director Panos Cosmatos and others at the Sundance Film Festival in 2018. Cage made a surprise appearance at the event.

The weapon forged by Red was based on the “F” from the logo for extreme metal band Celtic Frost.

The song "Starless" by the English progressive rock band King Crimson plays over the opening credits. It is taken from their 1974 album Red, which is also the name of Cage's character.

Release
The film premiered at the 2018 Sundance Film Festival on January 19. It began a limited cinematic release on September 13, 2018, playing at a maximum of 250 theatres, and was released on VOD on September 14.

Reception

Critical response
The website's critics consensus reads, "Mandys gonzo violence is fueled by a gripping performance by Nicolas Cage—and anchored with palpable emotion conveyed between his volcanic outbursts." At Metacritic, the film has a weighted average score of 81 out of 100 based on 30 critics, indicating "universal acclaim".

Reviewing the film after its world premiere at the Sundance Film Festival, Nick Allen of RogerEbert.com praised it, writing that "for all of the endless feral performances that Cage has given, in movies good, bad and forgettable, Cosmatos’ style-driven, ‘80s-tastic passion for weird worlds and characters takes full advantage of Cage’s greatness, and then some."

In a five-star review for Dirty Movies, Stephen Lee Naish called the film "a blood soaked revenge caper," praising Cosmatos for a "masterful approach" that "aligns him with Kubrick and Lynch in delivering perfectly believable and fully realized worlds and characters that operate within their own laws of physics." Meanwhile, film critic Christopher Stewardson said the film "is sure to become a cult favourite all of its own." In December 2018,  Esquire named Mandy the top film in its 25 Best Movies of 2018 So Far.

Accolades

References

External links
 
 
 

2018 films
2010s action horror films
American films with live action and animation
American action horror films
American action thriller films
English-language Belgian films
Films about hallucinogens
Films set in 1983
Films shot in Belgium
American films about revenge
Belgian films about revenge
Films about cults
American vigilante films
Films directed by Panos Cosmatos
Films scored by Jóhann Jóhannsson
American exploitation films
American splatter films
2018 independent films
2010s English-language films
2010s American films
2010s vigilante films